Patrick Victor Martindale White (28 May 1912 – 30 September 1990) was a British-born Australian writer who published 12 novels, three short-story collections, and eight plays, from 1935 to 1987.

White's fiction employs humour, florid prose, shifting narrative vantage points and stream of consciousness techniques. In 1973 he was awarded the Nobel Prize in Literature, "for an epic and psychological narrative art which has introduced a new continent into literature", as it says in the Swedish Academy's citation, the only Australian to have been awarded the prize. White was also the inaugural recipient of the Miles Franklin Award.

Childhood and adolescence
White was born in Knightsbridge, London, to Victor Martindale White and Ruth (née Withycombe), both Australians, in their apartment overlooking Hyde Park, London on 28 May 1912. His family returned to Sydney, Australia, when he was six months old. As a child he lived in a flat with his sister, a nanny, and a maid while his parents lived in an adjoining flat.  In 1916 they moved to a house in Elizabeth Bay that many years later became a nursing home, Lulworth House, the residents of which included Gough Whitlam, Neville Wran, and White's partner Manoly Lascaris.

At the age of four White developed asthma, a condition that had taken the life of his maternal grandfather. White's health was fragile throughout his childhood, which precluded his participation in many childhood activities.

He loved the theatre, which he first visited at an early age (his mother took him to see The Merchant of Venice at the age of six). This love was expressed at home when he performed private rites in the garden and danced for his mother's friends.

At the age of five he attended kindergarten at Sandtoft in Woollahra, in Sydney's Eastern Suburbs.

At the age of ten White was sent to Tudor House School, a boarding school in Moss Vale in the Southern Highlands of New South Wales, in an attempt to abate his asthma. It took him some time to adjust to the presence of other children. At boarding school, he started to write plays. Even at this early age, White wrote about palpably adult themes. In 1924 the boarding school ran into financial trouble, and the headmaster suggested that White be sent to a public school in England, a suggestion that his parents accepted.

White struggled to adjust to his new surroundings at Cheltenham College, England, describing it later as "a four-year prison sentence". He withdrew socially and had a limited circle of acquaintances. Occasionally, he would holiday with his parents at European locations, but their relationship remained distant. But he did spend time with his cousin Jack Withycombe during this period, and Jack's daughter Elizabeth Withycombe became a mentor to him while he was writing his first book of poems, Thirteen Poems between the years 1927–29.

While at school in London White made one close friend, Ronald Waterall, an older boy who shared similar interests. White's biographer, David Marr, wrote that "the two men would walk, arm-in-arm, to London shows; and stand around stage doors crumbing for a glimpse of their favourite stars, giving a practical demonstration of a chorus girl's high kick ... with appropriate vocal accompaniment". When Waterall left school White again withdrew. He asked his parents if he could leave school to become an actor. The parents compromised and allowed him to finish school early if he came home to Australia to try life on the land. They felt he should work on the land rather than become a writer, and hoped his work as a jackaroo would temper his artistic ambitions.

White spent two years working as a stockman at Bolaro, a  station near Adaminaby on the edge of the Snowy Mountains in southeastern Australia. Although he grew to respect the land, and his health improved, it was clear that he was not suited to it.

Travelling the world
From 1932 to 1935 White lived in England, studying French and German literature at King's College, Cambridge University. During his time at Cambridge he developed a romantic attraction to a young man who had come to King's College to become an Anglican priest. White dared not speak of his feelings for fear of losing the friendship and, like many other gay men of that period, he feared that his sexuality would doom him to a lonely life. Then, one night, the student priest, after an awkward liaison with two women, admitted to White that women meant nothing to him sexually. That became White's first love affair.

In 1934 White published a collection of poetry titled The Ploughman and Other Poems. The volume was published by P. R. Stephenson and Co., a newly established publishing firm in which his parents had invested £300. He also wrote a play named Bread and Butter Women, which was later performed by an amateur group (which included his sister Suzanne) at the tiny Bryant's Playhouse in Sydney. After being admitted to the degree of Bachelor of Arts in 1935, White briefly settled in London in an area frequented by artists. There, the young author thrived creatively for a time, writing several unpublished works and reworking Happy Valley, a novel that he had written while jackarooing. In 1937 White's father died, leaving him ten thousand pounds in inheritance. The fortune enabled him to write full-time in relative comfort. Two more plays followed before he succeeded in finding a publisher for Happy Valley. The novel was received well in London but poorly in Australia. He began writing another novel, Nightside, but abandoned it before its completion after receiving negative comments, a decision that he later admitted regretting.

In 1936, White met the painter Roy De Maistre, 18 years his senior, who became an important influence in his life and work. The two men never became lovers but remained firm friends. In White's own words, "He became what I most needed, an intellectual and aesthetic mentor". They had many similarities: both were gay and felt like outsiders in their own families, for whom both harboured ambivalent feelings yet maintained close lifelong links with them, particularly their mothers. They also both appreciated the benefits of social standing and its connections. Christian symbolism and biblical themes are common to both artists' work.

White dedicated his first novel Happy Valley to De Maistre, and acknowledged De Maistre's influence on his writing. In 1947 De Maistre's painting Figure in a Garden (The Aunt) was used as the cover for the first edition of White's The Aunt's Story. White bought many of De Maistre's paintings, all of which in 1974 he gave to the Art Gallery of New South Wales.

Toward the end of the 1930s White spent time in the United States, including Cape Cod, Massachusetts, and New York City – artistic hotbeds at the time, where he wrote The Living and the Dead. By the time World War II broke out he had returned to London and joined the British Royal Air Force. He was accepted as an intelligence officer, and was posted to the Middle East. He served in Egypt, Palestine, and Greece before the war was over. While in the Middle East he had an affair with a Greek army officer, Manoly Lascaris, who was to become his life partner.

White and Lascaris lived together in Cairo for six years before moving in 1948 to a small farm purchased by White at Castle Hill, now a Sydney suburb but then semi-rural. He named the house "Dogwoods", after trees he planted there. They lived there for 18 years, selling flowers, vegetables, milk, and cream as well as pedigree puppies. After the death of White's mother in 1963, they moved into a large house, Highbury, in Centennial Park, where they lived for the rest of their lives.

Growth of writing career

After the war, when White had settled down with Lascaris, his reputation as a writer increased with publication of The Aunt's Story and The Tree of Man in the United States in 1955 and shortly after in the United Kingdom. The Tree of Man was released to rave reviews in the United States, but in what had become a typical pattern, it was panned in Australia. White had doubts about whether to continue writing after his books were largely dismissed in Australia (three of them having been called 'un-Australian' by critics), but decided to persevere, and a breakthrough in Australia came when his next novel, Voss, won the inaugural Miles Franklin Literary Award.

In 1961, White published Riders in the Chariot, a bestseller and a prizewinner, garnering a second Miles Franklin Award. In 1963, White and Lascaris decided to sell the Castle Hill house. A number of White's books from the 1960s depict the fictional town of Sarsaparilla; his collection of short stories, The Burnt Ones, and the play, The Season at Sarsaparilla. Clearly established in his reputation as one of the world's great authors, he remained a private person, resisting opportunities for interviews and public appearances, though his circle of friends widened significantly.

In 1968, White wrote The Vivisector, a searing character portrait of an artist. Many people drew links to the Sydney painter John Passmore (1904–84) and White's friend, the painter Sidney Nolan, but White denied the connections. Patrick White was an art collector who had, as a young man, been deeply impressed by his friends Roy De Maistre and Francis Bacon, and later said he wished he had been an artist. By the mid-1960s, he had also become interested in encouraging dozens of young and less established artists, such as James Clifford, Erica McGilchrist, and Lawrence Daws. A portrait of White by Louis Kahan won the 1962 Archibald Prize. White was later friends with Brett Whiteley, the young star of Australian painting, in the 1970s. That friendship ended when White felt that Whiteley, a heroin addict, was deceitful and pushy about selling his paintings.

Deciding not to accept any more prizes for his work, White declined both the $10,000 Britannia Award and another Miles Franklin Award. Harry M. Miller proposed to work on a screenplay for Voss but nothing came of it. He became an active opponent of literary censorship and joined a number of other public figures in signing a statement of defiance against Australia's decision to participate in the Vietnam War. His name had sometimes been mentioned as a contender for the Nobel Prize in Literature, but in 1971, after losing to Aleksandr Solzhenitsyn, he wrote to a friend: "That Nobel Prize! I hope I never hear it mentioned again. I certainly don't want it; the machinery behind it seems a bit dirty, when we thought that only applied to Australian awards. In my case to win the prize would upset my life far too much, and it would embarrass me to be held up to the world as an Australian writer when, apart from the accident of blood, I feel I am temperamentally a cosmopolitan Londoner".

Nevertheless, in 1973, White did accept the Nobel Prize "for an epic and psychological narrative art, which has introduced a new continent into literature". His cause was said to have been championed by a Scandinavian diplomat resident in Australia. White enlisted Nolan to travel to Stockholm to accept the prize on his behalf. The award had an immediate impact on his career, as his publisher doubled the print run for The Eye of the Storm and gave him a larger advance for his next novel. White used the money from the prize to establish a trust to fund the Patrick White Award, given annually to established creative writers who have received little public recognition. He was invited by the House of Representatives to be seated on the floor of the House in recognition of his achievement. White declined, explaining that his nature could not easily adapt itself to such a situation. The last time such an invitation had been extended was in 1928, to pioneer aviator Bert Hinkler.

White was made Australian of the Year for 1974, but in a typically rebellious fashion, his acceptance speech encouraged Australians to spend the day reflecting on the state of the country. Privately, he was less than enthusiastic about it. In a letter to Marshall Best on 27 January 1974, he wrote: "Something terrible happened to me last week. There is an organisation which chooses an Australian of the Year, who has to appear at an official lunch in Melbourne Town Hall on Australia Day. This year I was picked on as they had run through all the swimmers, tennis players, yachtsmen".

Personal life
White and Lascaris hosted many dinner parties at Highbury, their Centennial Park home, in a leafy part of the affluent Eastern Suburbs of Sydney. In Patrick White, A Life, his biographer David Marr portrays White as a genial host but one who easily fell out with friends.

White supported the conservative, business oriented Liberal Party of Australia until the election of Gough Whitlam's Labor government and, following the 1975 Australian constitutional crisis, he became particularly antiroyalist, making a rare appearance on national television to broadcast his views on the matter. White also publicly expressed his admiration for the historian Manning Clark, satirist Barry Humphries, and unionist Jack Mundey.

Failing health
During the 1970s, White's health began to deteriorate: he had issues with his teeth, his eyesight was failing and he had chronic lung problems. During this time he became more openly political, and commented publicly on current issues. He was among the first group of the Companions of the Order of Australia in 1975 but resigned in June 1976 in protest at the dismissal of the Whitlam government in November 1975 by the Governor-General Sir John Kerr. In 1979, his novel The Twyborn Affair was shortlisted for the Booker Prize, but White requested that it to be removed to give younger writers a chance to win. (The prize was won by Penelope Fitzgerald, who ironically was just four years younger than White.) Soon after, White announced that he had written his last novel, and thenceforth would write only for radio or the stage.

Director Jim Sharman introduced himself to White while walking down a Sydney street, some time after White had seen a politically loaded stage revue by Sharman, Terror Australis, which had been panned by Sydney newspaper critics.  White had written a letter to the editor of a newspaper defending the show. There was a significant difference in their ages, but the two men became friends. Sharman in his theatrical circle, as well as his visual style as a director, inspired White to write a couple of new plays, notably Big Toys with its satirical portrayal of a posh and vulgar upper-class Sydney society. A few years later, Sharman asked White if he could make a film of The Night the Prowler. White agreed and wrote the screenplay for the film.

In 1981, White published his autobiography, Flaws in the Glass: a self-portrait, which explored issues about which he had publicly said little, such as his homosexuality, his dislike of the "subservient" attitude of Australian society towards Britain and the Royal family, and also the distance he had felt from his mother. On Palm Sunday, 1982, White addressed a crowd of 30,000 people, calling for a ban on uranium mining and for the destruction of nuclear weapons.

In 1986 White released one last novel, Memoirs of Many in One, but it was published under the pen name "Alex Xenophon Demirjian Gray" with White named as editor. In the same year, Voss was turned into an opera, with music by Richard Meale and the libretto adapted by David Malouf. White refused to see it when it was first performed at the Adelaide Festival of Arts, because Queen Elizabeth II had been invited, and chose instead to see it later in Sydney. In 1987, White wrote Three Uneasy Pieces, which incorporated his musings on ageing and society's efforts to achieve aesthetic perfection. When David Marr finished his biography of White in July 1990, his subject spent nine days going over the details with him.

White died in Sydney on 30 September 1990.

Legacy
In 2009, The Sydney Theatre Company staged White's play The Season at Sarsaparilla. In 2010 White received posthumous recognition for his novel The Vivisector, which was shortlisted for the Lost Man Booker Prize for 1970.

In 2011 Fred Schepisi's film of The Eye of the Storm was released with screenplay adaptation by Judy Morris, Geoffrey Rush playing the son Basil, Judy Davis as the daughter Dorothy, and Charlotte Rampling as the dying matriarch Elizabeth Hunter. It was the first screen realisation of a White novel, fittingly the one that played a key role in the Swedish panel's choice of White as Nobel prize winner.

List of works

Novels
Happy Valley (1939)
The Living and the Dead (1941)
The Aunt's Story (1948)
The Tree of Man (1955)
Voss (1957)
Riders in the Chariot (1961)
The Solid Mandala (1966)
The Vivisector (1970)
The Eye of the Storm (1973)
A Fringe of Leaves (1976)
The Twyborn Affair (1979)
Memoirs of Many in One (1986)
The Hanging Garden (2012) (Unfinished, posthumous)

Short story collections
The Burnt Ones (1964)
The Cockatoos (1974)
Three Uneasy Pieces (1987)

Poetry
Thirteen Poems / under the pseudonym Patrick Victor Martindale. – Sydney : Privately printed, (ca. 1929)
The Ploughman and Other Poems. – Sydney : Beacon Press, (1935)

Plays
Bread and Butter Women (1935) Unpublished.
The School for Friends (1935) Unpublished.
Return to Abyssinia (1948) Unpublished.
The Ham Funeral (1947) prem. Union Theatre, Adelaide, 1961.
The Season at Sarsaparilla (1962)
A Cheery Soul (1963)
Night on Bald Mountain (1964)
Big Toys (1977)
Signal Driver: a Morality Play for the Times (1982)
Netherwood (1983)
Shepherd on the Rocks (1987)

Screenplay
 The Night the Prowler (1978)

'AutobiographyFlaws in the Glass (1981)

Honours and awards
In 1970, White was offered a knighthood but declined it.

Both White and Nugget Coombs were members of the first group of six people appointed Companion of the Order of Australia (AC) in the civil division, (now called the general division). The awards were announced in the 1975 Queen's Birthday Honours List. They both resigned from the order in 1976, when the Knight of the Order of Australia (AK) was created. White resigned in protest at the November 1975 dismissal of the Whitlam government by Sir John Kerr.

Commemoration

White is commemorated by the Patrick White Lawns adjacent to the National Library of Australia in Canberra. The lawns extend from the library north to Lake Burley Griffin and provide a venue for concerts and other large scale public events under the auspices of the National Capital Authority.

Notes

References

Further readingA Conversation with Patrick White, Australian Writers in Profile, Southerly, No.3 1973
Barry Argyle, Patrick White, Writers and Critics Series, Oliver and Boyd, London, 1967
Peter Beatson, The Eye in the Mandala, Patrick White: A Vision of Man and God, Barnes & Noble, London, 1976
John Docker, Patrick White and Romanticism: The Vivisector, Southerly, No.1, 1973
Simon During, Patrick White, Oxford University Press, Melbourne, VIC, 1996.
Michael Wilding, Studies in Classic Australian Fiction, Sydney Studies in Society and Culture, 16, 1997
Ian Henderson and Anouk Lang (eds.) Patrick White Beyond the Grave, Anthem Press, 2015
Helen Verity Hewitt, Patrick White and the Influence of the Visual Arts in his Work, Doctoral Thesis, Dept. of English, University of Melbourne, 1995.

Clayton Joyce (ed.) Patrick White: A Tribute, Angus & Robertson, Harper Collins, North Ryde, 1991.
Brian Kiernan, Patrick White, Macmillan Commonwealth Writers Series, The Macmillan Press, London, 1980.
Alan Lawson (ed.) Patrick White: Selected Writings, University of Queensland Press, St. Lucia, 1994
David Marr, Patrick White – A Life, Random House Australia, Sydney, 1991.
David Marr (ed.), Patrick White Letters, Random House Australia, Sydney, 1994.
Irmtraud Petersson, ‘'New "Light" on Voss: The Significance of its Title, World Literature Written in English 28.2 (Autumn 1988) 245-59.
Laurence Steven, Dissociation and Wholeness in Patrick White's Fiction, Wilfrid Laurier University Press, Ontario, 1989.
Elizabeth McMahon, Brigitta Olubas. Remembering Patrick White : contemporary critical essays, Rodopi, Amsterdam, New York, 2010.
Denise Varney, Patrick White's Theatre: Australian Modernism on Stage, Sydney University Press, Sydney, 2021.
Patrick White, Patrick White Speaks, Primavera Press, Sydney, Publisher Paul Brennan, 1989.
Stephen Michael Sasse, Companion notes to the Aunt's story by Patrick White, WriteLight, 2012.
Cynthia Vanden Drissen, Writing the nation : Patrick White and the indigene, Rodopi, Amsterdam, New York, 2009.
William Yang, Patrick White: The Late Years, PanMacmillan Australia, 1995

External links

Patrick White – Existential Explorer—essay by Karin Hansson at the official Nobel Prize website.
Why Bother With Patrick White?—excerpts from White's novels, as well as a range of critical interpretations of his work and personal remembrances of White as a man, courtesy of the Australian Broadcasting Corporation.
Patrick White reappraised from the Times Literary Supplement
Press release from the National Library of Australia (NLA) to announce the acquisition of a large collection of Patrick White's personal documents and manuscripts.
Online catalogue of the documents and manuscripts acquired by the NLA.
Detailed analysis of White's acclaimed novel Voss, by Len Webster.
Patrick White on Trove
"Autobiography", Nobel prize

1912 births
1990 deaths
Alumni of King's College, Cambridge
Australian anti–nuclear weapons activists
Anti–Vietnam War activists
Australian male dramatists and playwrights
Australian of the Year Award winners
Australian male short story writers
Australian gay writers
Nobel laureates in Literature
People educated at Cheltenham College
People from Knightsbridge
Writers from Sydney
Writers from London
Royal Air Force personnel of World War II
Australian Nobel laureates
Miles Franklin Award winners
ALS Gold Medal winners
Adaminaby
20th-century Australian novelists
Australian LGBT dramatists and playwrights
Australian LGBT novelists
LGBT Nobel laureates
Former Companions of the Order of Australia
20th-century Australian short story writers
Australian male novelists
English emigrants to Australia
20th-century Australian dramatists and playwrights